The consensus 1970 College Basketball All-American team, as determined by aggregating the results of four major All-American teams.  To earn "consensus" status, a player must win honors from a majority of the following teams: the Associated Press, the USBWA, The United Press International and the National Association of Basketball Coaches.

1970 Consensus All-America team

Individual All-America teams

AP Honorable Mention:

 Nate Archibald, UTEP
 Jim Ard, Cincinnati
 Dennis Awtrey, Santa Clara
 Henry Bibby, UCLA
 Bill Cain, Iowa State
 Corky Calhoun, Penn
 Jim Collins, New Mexico State
 Dave Cowens, Florida State
 Jarrett Durham, Duquesne
 Mike Grosso, Louisville
 Jeff Halliburton, Drake
 Steve Hawes, Washington
 Sam Lacey, New Mexico State
 Bob Lienhard, Georgia
 Stan Love, Oregon
 Jim McDaniels, Western Kentucky
 Cliff Meely, Colorado
 Dean Meminger, Marquette
 John Mengelt, Auburn
 Mike Newlin, Utah
 Andy Owens, Florida
 Geoff Petrie, Princeton
 Howard Porter, Villanova
 Mike Pratt, Kentucky
 Marv Roberts, Utah State
 Dave Robisch, Kansas
 Curtis Rowe, UCLA
 Ralph Simpson, Michigan State
 Willie Sojourner, Weber State
 Dave Sorenson, Ohio State
 John Sutter, Tulane
 Ollie Taylor, Houston
 Jerry Venable, Kansas State
 Vann Williford, NC State
 Rich Yunkus, Georgia Tech

Academic All-Americans
On May 12, 1970, CoSIDA announced the 1970 Academic All-America team.  The following is the 1969–70 Academic All-America Men's Basketball Team as selected by CoSIDA:

See also
 1969–70 NCAA University Division men's basketball season

References

NCAA Men's Basketball All-Americans
All-Americans